Indri are the members of an ethnic group of South Sudan. Most of them are Muslims. The number of persons in this group is about 1,000. They speak Indri, a Ubangian language.

References

Indri Joshua Project

Ethnic groups in South Sudan